UFC on FX: Maynard vs. Guida (also known as UFC on FX 4) was a mixed martial arts event held by the Ultimate Fighting Championship on June 22, 2012 in Revel Casino in Atlantic City, New Jersey.

Background

The main event consists of a five-round, non-championship, bout between Clay Guida and Gray Maynard. This was Guida's first fight since losing to future UFC Lightweight Champion Benson Henderson on November 12, 2011 at UFC on Fox 1.  Maynard's previous bout was on October 8, 2011 at UFC 136, against then UFC Lightweight Champion Frankie Edgar.

The event was the seventh that the UFC has hosted in Atlantic City, but the first since UFC 53 in 2005.

Rich Attonito was expected to face Rick Story at the event. However, Attonito was forced out of the bout with an injury and replaced by Papy Abedi. Abedi was also forced out of the fight with an injury and replaced by newcomer Brock Jardine.

Jimy Hettes was expected to face Steven Siler at the event. However, Hettes was forced out of the bout with an injury and replaced by newcomer Joey Gambino.

Matt Riddle was expected to face Luis Ramos in the event. However, Riddle was forced out of the bout with an injury and replaced by Matt Brown.

Edwin Figueroa was expected to face Ken Stone at the event. However, Figueroa was forced out of the bout with an injury and replaced by Francisco Rivera. Rivera was injured as well and was replaced by Dustin Pague, who had just fought and won at UFC on FX: Johnson vs. McCall two weeks before this event.

Results

Bonus awards

Fighters were awarded $50,000 bonuses.

 Fight of the Night: Sam Stout vs. Spencer Fisher
 Knockout of the Night: Cub Swanson
 Submission of the Night: Dan Miller

References

UFC on FX
2012 in mixed martial arts
Mixed martial arts in New Jersey
Sports competitions in Atlantic City, New Jersey
2012 in sports in New Jersey